"Party Don't Stop" is the debut single by Kenyan alternative hip hop group Camp Mulla, featuring Kenyan rapper Collo. It peaked at #2 on 98.4 Capital FM's radio playlist Hits Not Homework and at #13 on Homeboyz Radio's HitList, making it Camp Mulla's most successful single so far. The single won an award for "Teeniez' Group or Collabo" at the 2012 Chaguo La Teeniez Awards.

Music video
The music video for the song was released on Camp Mulla's YouTube channel on September 16, 2011. It was shot at the underground parking lot of the Westgate shopping mall in Nairobi, Kenya.

Track listing
Digital download

Remixes
The following is a list of remixes made of the song and are not included in the official single.
Digital download

Airplay

References

Kenyan songs
Hip hop songs
2011 singles
2011 songs